This list of Operational Requirements for nuclear weapons shows known Operational Requirements (ORs) specifically for nuclear bombs intended for use by the Royal Navy (RN) and the Royal Air Force (RAF) of the United Kingdom (UK).

An Operational Requirement, commonly abbreviated OR, was a UK Air Ministry document setting out the required characteristics for a future (i.e., as-yet unbuilt) military aircraft or weapon system.  The numbered OR would describe what type of weapon was required.  Operational Requirements were carried over with the dissolution of the Air Ministry and the creation of the Ministry of Defence (MoD).

Table of Operational Requirements

Further reading

See also
 List of Rainbow Codes
 List of Air Ministry Specifications

Cold War military equipment of the United Kingdom
Nuclear weapons of the United Kingdom
United Kingdom defence procurement